Conrad Frederick Sauer (also known as Cuno F. Sauer; October 13, 1866 – November 23, 1927) was a German American pharmacist from Richmond, Virginia who founded the C.F. Sauer Company on October 13, 1887, his 21st birthday. He was also a real estate developer, and developed the Sauer's Gardens neighborhood near his factory.

Biography
Conrad Frederick Sauer was born in Richmond, Virginia on October 13, 1866.

Conrad Sauer married Olga, had they had a son, Conrad Frederick Sauer, Jr., and daughter Helen Sauer (Will) (? – 1994).

He died in Richmond on November 23, 1927.

References

1866 births
1927 deaths
Businesspeople from Richmond, Virginia
American pharmacists